"Imprint" is the thirteenth episode of the first season of Masters of Horror. Directed by Takashi Miike, the episode was scheduled to premiere on January 27, 2006—but was shelved by Showtime over concerns about its extremely graphic and disturbing content. It was later released to DVD on September 26, 2006.

Plot
Christopher (Billy Drago), a Victorian-era American journalist, is traveling through Japan looking for Komomo (Itô), a lost girlfriend whom he had promised to rescue from prostitution and bring to the United States. Landing on an island populated solely by whores and their masters, he is solicited by a syphilitic tout (Yamada). He claims no knowledge of Komomo, but Christopher has to spend the night, requesting the company of a girl (Youki Kudoh) lurking back in the shadows, who joins him in his room.

Disfigured and disturbed, the girl claims a closer connection with the dead than the living. She tells him that Komomo was there, but hanged herself after her lover never came for her. Distraught, Christopher seeks solace in sake. Falling asleep, he requests a bedtime story. The girl recounts her past — her mother, a midwife, was forced to sell her to a brothel after her father died, and eventually she wound up on the island. Komomo was the most popular girl there, making the others jealous. When the Madam's jade ring was stolen, Komomo was tortured to confess. After suffering hideously — underarms burned, needles driven under fingernails and into gums — she hanged herself in torment, tired of waiting for her lover.

Christopher refuses to believe the girl's story, and he pleads for the whole truth.  The girl starts again, and in the second telling, her family is no longer happy nor loving; her father was an alcoholic, her mother an abortion care provider. She was taken in by a Buddhist priest, who, presumably, molested her and inspired an obsession with hell. Her father never died of lung disease — she beat him to death for raping her. Again she tells of being sold into prostitution, but gives a new version of the dark fate of Christopher's beloved Komomo. Despite the kindness of Komomo, who befriended her, the disfigured girl stole the jade ring and planted Komomo's hairpin to frame her — and after Komomo was tortured, killed her. She explains to Christopher that she intended to save Komomo from hell: as Komomo would be doomed for having such an evil friend, only through betrayal could she sever the friendship and ensure Komomo a deservedly beautiful afterlife.

Christopher, losing control, is desperately convinced something has been left out. He begs for the whole truth. The woman then reveals a horrifying secret: a tiny second head in the center of a hand hidden beneath her hair — her "Little Sis", a parasitic twin, the woman's identity now partly revealed as that of a Futakuchi-onna, a type of supernatural being. Her mother and father had been brother and sister; "Little Sis" was the fruit of their incest. It was "Little Sis" who commanded her to kill her father, and to steal the ring. As the hand begins to talk like Komomo in a high-pitched voice, Christopher is overcome by madness and threatens to shoot her and send her to hell. She informs him that wherever he goes, he will be in hell - a flashback implies that he was responsible for his own sister's death. He shoots the girl in the heart and then the head. Before dying, the girl's body turns into Komomo.

The epilogue finds Christopher in a Japanese prison serving time for the murder of the girl. When he is given a water ration, he hallucinates that the bucket contains an aborted fetus, and cradles the bucket while singing a lullaby, kept company only by the ghosts of Komomo and his dead sister.

Production
Japanese director Takashi Miike was among the filmmakers chosen to create an episode for Masters of Horror. Considered to be a "deliberately and spectacularly transgressive director whose work is lionized by a substantial share of the young generation of Internet critics and horror film fans, while routinely rejected as repulsively sadistic by much of the mainstream media", Miike crafted "Imprint" based on a traditional Japanese story, "Bokkee Kyotee", by Shimako Iwai. He explained the reasons he chose the film: "It had a simplicity that I liked. Also, it had that kind of story I imagined the audience telling their friends after seeing the film. It's a story that could have been told before the horror genre was around – it's more like a kaidan – a traditional scary story."

It included graphic depictions of violence and aborted fetuses, but Miike believed he was staying within the boundaries of acceptability: "I thought that I was right up to the limit of what American television would tolerate. As I was making the film I kept checking to make sure that I wasn't going over the line, but I evidently misestimated."

After previewing the episode, Mick Garris, the series creator and executive producer, requested that it be edited to tone down the content, but, despite some changes being made, Showtime felt it was too disturbing to air on television. The episode, scheduled to air January 27, 2006, was canceled and became the only one of the series to remain unaired in the United States. It was shown, however, at the Yubari International Fantastic Film Festival in Japan on 25 February 2006 and aired in the UK on Bravo (British TV channel) on 7 April 2006.

Release
The DVD was released on September 26, 2006. It was the thirteenth episode of the first season and the tenth to be released on DVD. The episode appears on the fourth volume of the Blu-ray Disc compilation of the series.

Chiller aired the episode as part of the series re-runs on the channel; however, along with some language and nudity content, Chiller removed some scenes, such as some of Komomo's torture and the depiction of fetuses.

References

External links
 

2006 American television episodes
Films directed by Takashi Miike
Incest in television
Masters of Horror episodes
Television shows based on Japanese novels
Parasitic twinning in culture

it:Episodi di Masters of Horror (prima stagione)#Sulle tracce del terrore